Tumbura, sometimes spelled Tambora or Tambura, is a town in South Sudan.

Location
The town is located in Tambura County, Western Equatoria, in the western part of South Sudan, near the International borders with the Democratic Republic of the Congo (DRC) and with the Central African Republic (CAR).

Overview
Tumbura is a small town close to the country's western border with DRC and CAR. The area around Tumbura has witnessed the ravages of the Lord's Resistance Army (LRA) who have terrorized civilians in this area along with neighbouring populations in DRC and CAR since 2008.

Population
In 2010, the population of  the town of Tumbura was estimated at about 9,500.

Transport
The major road south (A44) leads to Li Yubu, South Sudan, at the border with the Central African Republic. A44-North leads to Wau, South Sudan. Two smaller roads lead out of town towards the east and west of Tumburaa. The town is also served by Tumbura Airport.

See also
 Tumbura Airport
 Western Equatoria
 Equatoria

References

External links
Location of Tumbura At Google Maps

Populated places in Western Equatoria
Equatoria